Minyè Aungdin, husband of Princess Shwe Sin Tu, daughter of King Thalun and his queen, who was daughter of Sawbwa of Monè in Shan State. He died from an excess of opium smoking. He is portrayed sitting on a pedestal with a topknot and holding a harp.

References

18